Engineer in Chief or  ENC is the chief engineer of Bangladesh Army. He is head of the Military Engineering Service. Engineer in Chief is also a Colonel Commandant of the Bangladesh Army Corps of Engineers.

The current Engineer in Chief of Bangladesh Army is Major General Mohammed Jubayer Salehin, BSP, SGP, afwc, psc.

List of Engineer-in-Chiefs

References

Bangladesh Army